Aaron Keith Heal (born 13 March 1983) is an Australian cricketer who played domestically for Western Australia and later the Melbourne Renegades. A left-arm orthodox spinner and capable lower-order batsman, Heal debuted during the 2003–04 season, and played in the team that won that season's ING Cup. He established himself in Western Australia's first-class (Sheffield Shield) and limited-overs (Ford Ranger Cup) sides during the 2006–07 season, taking over from Brad Hogg as the team's primary spinner, but was selected less regularly over the following seasons. Heal's last first-class and one-day matches came during the 2010–11 season, but he was a regular when the team played in the KFC Twenty20 Big Bash, maintaining both a low economy rate and a low bowling average. His performances at Twenty20 led to his naming in Australia's initial 30 man squad for the 2009 ICC World Twenty20. Heal signed with the Melbourne Renegades for inaugural season of the Big Bash League, playing four matches.

References

External links
 

1983 births
Australian cricketers
Living people
Melbourne Renegades cricketers
Cricketers from Perth, Western Australia
Western Australia cricketers